Weak River  may refer to a river in Chinese mythology or an actual river in China:

Places 
Ruo Shui, a river in northern China,  also known as the Etsin Gol or Ruo He or Ejin River

Mythology 
Weak River, a river in Chinese mythology in which the specific gravity was so light that no object could float, also known as Weak Water or Ruoshui.